Rinderbraten, is a dish of German origin whose name means "beef roast". It is made from a large round of beef, stuffed with pork fat that has been rolled in a combination of salt, red pepper, brown sugar, allspice, and cloves. The round is then submerged in brine for up to six weeks, then boiled, and then simmered, with the blackened outer layer of beef and fat removed and cinnamon sprinkled over it before serving.

Variations
A modified Rinderbraten called Spice Round or Spiced Round was once a common centerpiece of holiday meals in Nashville, Tennessee.

After the Civil War, Nashville was a hub of the meat-packing industry in the American south due to an influx of Swiss and German immigrants who founded several meat-packing companies along the Cumberland River, a major shipping route between the American north and south. One particular meat-packer was Mr. William Jacobs, who founded the Jacobs Packing Company in 1865.

Jacobs, originally from Wittenburg, Germany, only packed during the winter months due to local climate and the availability of meat from local stock beginning in September. Jacobs knew that Rinderbraten, a specialty of his native country, was prepared with brine in order to preserve the meat through winter, so he began producing batches of it for the local populace as an easily stored convenience. In 1865, he was able to convince the posh Maxwell House Hotel to add it to their winter menu, and from there it gained in popularity, attracting other meat-packing companies to emulate his success.

At one time, there were over 30 butchers and meat-packers in Nashville, and nearly all of them produced Spice Round. Each used a slightly different and closely guarded recipe.

Nashville's version of Rinderbraten was not stuffed with pork fat; rather, it was larded throughout the meat with special horns. In addition to the fat being blended with the traditional Rinderbraten spice, typically the same spices would be used in the brining solution and run through the meat using specially prepared larding needles, leading to a much more heavily spiced preparation than the German version. Because of this, most Nashville families omitted the sprinkling of cinnamon over the cooked meat.

It is still available in some grocery stores in the city during the holiday season.

See also

 List of beef dishes

References

German cuisine
Beef dishes
Culture of Nashville, Tennessee
History of Nashville, Tennessee
German beef dishes